A statue of Gilbert du Motier, Marquis de Lafayette is installed in Los Angeles' Lafayette Park, in the U.S. state of California. The sculpture was installed at the park's Wilshire Boulevard entrance in 1937.

References 

Cultural depictions of Gilbert du Motier, Marquis de Lafayette
Monuments and memorials in Los Angeles
Outdoor sculptures in Greater Los Angeles
Sculptures of men in California
Statues in Los Angeles
Westlake, Los Angeles